Patras (Katharevousa and) is Greece's third-largest city and the regional capital of Western Greece, in the northern Peloponnese,  west of Athens. The city is built at the foot of Mount Panachaikon, overlooking the Gulf of Patras.

As of the 2011 census, the city of Patras has a population of 167,446 and the municipal unit has 170,896 inhabitants; the municipality has 213,984 inhabitants. The population of its functional urban area was 217,555 in 2011. The core settlement has a history spanning four millennia. In the Roman period, it had become a cosmopolitan center of the eastern Mediterranean whilst, according to the Christian tradition, it was also the place of Saint Andrew's martyrdom.

Dubbed as Greece's 'Gate to the West, Patras is a commercial hub, while its busy port is a nodal point for trade and communication with Italy and the rest of Western Europe. The city has three public universities, hosting a large student population and rendering Patras an important scientific centre  with a field of excellence in technological education. The Rio-Antirio Bridge connects Patras' easternmost suburb of Rio to the town of Antirrio, connecting the Peloponnese peninsula with mainland Greece.

Every year, in February, the city hosts one of Europe's largest carnivals. Notable features of the Patras Carnival include its mammoth satirical floats and balls and parades, enjoyed by hundreds of thousands of visitors in a Mediterranean climate. Patras is also famous for supporting an indigenous cultural scene active mainly in the performing arts and modern urban literature. It was European Capital of Culture in 2006.

Geography

A central feature of the urban geography of Patras is its division into upper and lower sections. This is the result of an interplay between natural geography and human settlement patterns; the lower section of the city (Kato Poli), which includes the 19th-century urban core and the port, is adjacent to the sea and stretches between the estuaries of the rivers of Glafkos and Haradros. It is built on what was originally a bed of river soils and dried-up swamps. The older upper section (Ano Poli) covers the area of the pre-modern settlement, around the Fortress, on what is the last elevation of Mount Panachaikon before the Gulf of Patras.

Hydrology
The largest river in the area is the Glafkos, flowing to the south of Patras. Glafkos springs in Mount Panachaikon and its water is, since 1925, collected in a small mountainous reservoir-dam near the village of Souli and subsequently pumped in order to provide energy for the country's first hydroelectric plant. Other smaller streams are Charadros, Meilichos, Kallinaos, Panagitsa and the mountain torrent Diakoniaris.

Climate
Patras has a Mediterranean climate. It features the typical mild, wet winters and hot, dry summers, with spring and autumn being pleasant transitional seasons. Autumn in Patras, however, is wetter than spring.

Ecology
Of great importance for the biological diversity of the area and the preservation of its climate is the swamp of Agyia, a small and coastal aquatic ecosystem of only , north of the city centre. The main features of this wetland are its apparent survival difficulty, being at the heart of a densely populated urban centre that features a relatively arid climate and its admittedly high level of biodiversity, with over 90 species of birds being observed until the early 1990s, according to a study by the Patras Bureau of the Hellenic Ornithological Society.

History

 Antiquity 

The first traces of settlement in Patras date to as early as the third millennium BC, in the area of modern Aroi. Patras flourished for the first time in the Post-Helladic or Mycenean period (1580–1100 BC). Ancient Patras was formed by the unification of three Mycenaean villages in modern Aroi, namely ancient Aroe, Antheia (from mythological Antheia) and Mesatis. Mythology has it that after the Dorian invasion, a group of Achaeans from Laconia led by the eponymous Patreus established a colony. In antiquity Patras remained a farming city. It was in Roman times that it became an important port.

After 280 BC and prior to the Roman occupation of Greece, Patras played a significant role in the foundation of the second "Achaean League" (Achaiki Sympoliteia), along with the cities of Dyme, Tritaea and Pharai. Later on, and following the Roman occupation of Greece in 146 BC, Patras played a key role, and Augustus refounded the city as a Roman colony in the area. In addition, Patras has been a Christian centre since the early days of Christianity, and, in both the East Orthodox and Roman Catholic traditions, it is the city where Saint Andrew was crucified.

 Middle Ages and early modern 

In the Byzantine era, Patras continued to be an important port as well as an industrial centre.  One of the most scholarly philosophers and theologians of the time, Arethas of Caesarea was born at Patrae, at around 860. By the 9th century, there are strong signs the city was prosperous: the widow Danielis from Patras had accumulated immense wealth in land ownership,  the carpet and textile industry, and offered critical support in the ascent of Basil I the Macedonian to the Byzantine throne.

In 1205, the city was captured by William of Champlitte and Villehardouin, and became a part of the principality of Achaea. It became the seat of the Barony of Patras, and its Latin archbishop primate of the principality. In 1408, Patras became Venetian, until it was recaptured in 1430 by the Despotate of Morea and its despot Constantine Palaiologos, who thus succeeded in recovering for the Byzantine Empire the whole of the Morea, apart from Venetian possessions. The administration of Patras was given to George Sphrantzes, while Constantine was immediately contested by the Ottoman Empire and later, in 1449, became emperor of the Byzantine empire.

Patras remained a part of the Despotate of Morea until 1458, when it was conquered by the Sultan of the Ottoman Empire, Mehmet II. Though Mehmet granted the city special privileges and tax reductions, it never became a major centre of commerce. Venice and Genoa attacked and captured it several times in the 15th and 16th centuries, but never re-established their rule effectively, except for a period of Venetian rule in 1687–1715 after the Morean War.

In 1772, a naval battle took place off the city between the Russians and Ottomans.

 Modern era 
Patras was one of the first cities in which the Greek Revolution began in 1821;  the Ottoman garrison, confined to the citadel, held out until 1828. Finally the city was surrendered on 7 October 1828 to the French expeditionary force in the Peloponnese, under the command of General Maison. After the war, most of the city and its buildings were completely destroyed. The new city was planned under the supervision of Stamatis Voulgaris following orders by Ioannis Kapodistrias.

Patras developed quickly into the second-largest urban centre in late-19th-century Greece. The city benefited from its role as the main export port for the agricultural produce of the Peloponnese.

In the early 20th century, Patras developed fast and became the first Greek city to introduce public streetlights and electrified tramways. The war effort necessitated by the First World War hampered the city's development and also created uncontrollable urban sprawl after the influx of displaced persons from Asia Minor after the 1922 population exchange between Greece and Turkey. In the Second World War, the city was a major target of Italian air raids. In the Axis occupation period, a German military command was established and German and Italian troops stationed in the city. After the liberation in 1944, the city recovered, but in later years was increasingly overshadowed by the urban pole of Athens. Since 2014, the city's mayor is Kostas Peletidis.

Urban landscape

The city is divided into the upper and the lower section, connected with roads and broad stairs. The upper section (Ano Poli) is the older and the more picturesque; however, the lower section (Kato Poli) is laid out according to the 1858 city plan, featuring a variety of squares. The most notable of these are the Psila Alonia and the Georgiou I Square. A number of notable neoclassical buildings are to be found, including the Apollon Theatre in Georgiou I Square, the City Hall, the headquarters of the Local Trade Association and the Court of Justice. A replica of Patras Lighthouse, the city's emblematic old lighthouse – which was at the dock of Ayios Nikolaos – rises at the end of Trion Navarchon street, near the temple of Saint Andreas.

In general, much of Patras' coastline is framed by roads and avenues running alongside; these include Dymaion Coast to the south and Iroon Polytechneiou Street to the north.

Main sights

Patras and its region is home to various Ancient Greek, Roman and Byzantine Monuments, including the Roman Odeon, the Fortress of Rio and the Fortress (castle) of Patras. More specifically, the main sights of the city are:

The Patras Archaeological Museum focuses on the exhibition of various archaeological finds, from the Mycenaean to the Late Roman era, discovered in Patras and the wider Achaea region. The museum is housed in a modern and special architectural building designed by the architect Theophanis Bobotis. 
The Mycenaean cemetery of Voudeni (Skioessa),  from the center of Patras, is one of the most important sites of the Mycenaean world, showing active use for nearly five hundred years (1500–1000 BC). The site itself appears to have been inhabited from the Bronze Age until middle Roman times (1800 BC–AD 400).
The Roman Odeon, the most significant ancient monument, is in the upper town and was built around 160 AD, in the reign of either Antoninus Pius or Marcus Aurelius. It has been restored and partially reconstructed, and is used as an open-air theatre for performances and concerts in the summer.
The Roman Amphitheatre, near the Roman Odeon, in Ifestou street, dating from the 1st century AD, at a period of the biggest development of Roman Patras. Its area has been only partially excavated.
The Roman aqueduct that led from the springs of Romanos to the acropolis. The aqueduct measured  from the water cistern to the castle. For the greater part of this distance, the water passed through an underground channel, passing over valleys and gorges on carefully constructed archways, parts of which still stand, in the area of Aroi.
Other Roman monuments include the ruins of the Roman stadium, remains of the Roman wall and a preserved bridge over the river Kallinaos.
The medieval Patras Castle, in the ancient acropolis overlooking the city, was initially built in the 6th century AD by the Byzantine emperor Justinian, having many additions from the period of the Frankish and Venetian rule of the city, up to as far as the time of the Despotate of Morea and later the Ottoman Empire. Its current outline dates back to the second Venetian rule of the town (1687–1715). Today, its interior is used as a public garden.
The church of Saint Andrew of Patras was founded in 1908 by King George I and was inaugurated in 1974. It is dedicated to Saint Andrew, the patron of the city. It is the second-largest temple of Byzantine style in the Balkans (after the Cathedral of Saint Sava in Belgrade). A congregation of at least 5,000 can attend a sermon within the church.
The municipal Theatre Apollon, built in 1872 designed by architect Ernst Ziller. The building is characteristic of the 19th-century neoclassical style and is in the central square of the city.
The Achaia Clauss wine industry and tasting center, which is on the outskirts in Petroto village. It was founded in 1861 by the Bavarian Gustav Clauss and is most famous for its Mavrodaphne.This place also houses the oldest wine of Greece, the old mavrodaphne of 1873.
Residence of Kostis Palamas, a preserved neoclassical building on 241 Corinthou Street in the city center, where Kostis Palamas and the Italian painter Matilde Serao were born. It is an aesthetic building and the creation of the museum there fulfilled the great vision of businessman Athanasios Stefanopoulos, who bought the collapsing building on Corinthou Street to create the Cultural Center Kostis Palamas.
 The Ottoman baths (16th century), still retain their initial use, and are one of the oldest Ottoman baths surviving in Europe.
The Patras Lighthouse, a reconstructed "Faros" (Lighthouse), a landmark of the city.
The Agiou Nikolaou Stairs, Gerokostopoulou Stairs, Patreos Stairs and Trion Navarchon Stairs, outdoor grand staircases all over the centre of the city dividing the upper town from downtown.

Parks and squares
Georgiou I Square, the central square and the heart of the city. It was named after King George I. The square's fountains were installed in 1875 at a cost of 70,000 drachmas each, a huge amount for the finances of Greece and Patra at the time. It was and continues to be the center of political and cultural life in the city, hosting all significant activities, political gatherings, rallies, cultural events and, most importantly for some, its carnival.
Ethnikis Antistaseos ("National Resistance Square")

Kapodistria Square in the district of Markato.
Trion Symmachon Square bears the name of the three Allied Powers who fought in the Battle of Navarino; Britain, France and Russia. The square features a flower clock and links the Agiou Nikolaou pedestrian way with the seaside front and the dock of Agios Nikolaos.
Psilalonia Square ( or formally ) is one of Patras's most popular squares. It features a fountain, many sidewalks, palm trees and playgrounds. A bronze statue of Germanos of Patras stands on the northern end, while a memorial plaque to people executed during the Axis occupation of Greece stands on the south-western corner. It is surrounded by several shops, restaurants and cafes and a number of modernist buildings. It was completed in the mid-to-late 19th century, when trees were added, along with neoclassical buildings. After World War II and the Greek Civil War, however, and through the 1960s and 1970s, most neoclassical buildings were replaced by eight-storey residential buildings. In the west end, a  cliff overlooks the pedestrian Trion Navarchon Street, and offers a wide vista across the western Gulf of Patras, including the mountains of Aitoloakarnania.
Saint George Square. There is the monument to the fighters of 1821 on which is engraved the "declaration of the revolutionaries of Patras to the states of Europe" (22/3/1821).
 The Spinney of Patras, is in a pine-tree-covered hill, which is dubbed "the Gulf of Patras' veranda" because of the panoramic view it offers. The spinney is ideal for recreational walks and jogging, with its specially formed paths and the shade offered by the tall trees.
South Park of Patras 

Architecture

Patra is a relatively newly built city, as its medieval buildings were completely destroyed in the Greek War of Independence. The oldest surviving buildings (apart from ancient monuments and the castle) are the church of Pantocrator in Ano Poli and a residential building (Tzini's house) at the corner of Agiou Nikolaou and Maisonos street, built in 1832. The area on the south of the castle, around the Roman Odeon, the church of Pantokrator, in the Upper Town (Ano Poli), is the most appealing of the city, because of its status as the only area where construction height is limited to two-storey buildings.
Ιn Ano Poli is interesting the old school complex "Georgios Glarakis" work of the architect Georgios Petrιtsopoulos in 1931 which is built with stone and recently became a nice bioclimatic school. At the beginning of the 20th century, outside the school complex "Georgios Glarakis", line 2 of the tram ended, starting from Agios Dionysios, going up  Dimitriou Gounari Street, passing behind the church of Pantanassa, entering Roman Odeon and finished outside the Glarakis school complex.

Historical buildings and mansions of the city, apart Tzini's house, include also the Prapopoulos building, Golfinopoulos mansion (Alhambra), Perivolaropoulos mansion, Palamas house, while among the demolished after WWII were Tsiklitiras mansion, Kanellopoulos house, Chaidopoulos building, Frangopoulos house, Green mansion and Mineyko mansion.

Districts and neighbourhoods

Nowadays, the municipal units of Rio, Paralia, Messatida and Vrachnaiika have functionally become a part of the wider urban complex of Patras. Apart from the city center, the main districts of Patras are:

Government

Patras is the regional capital of Western Greece and the capital of the Achaea regional unit. Since 2011, the city is also the capital of the administrative division, which includes (along with Western Greece) the regions of Peloponnese and the Ionian Islands.

Municipality

The current municipality of Patras was formed at the 2011 local government reform by the merger of 5 municipalities that made up the Patras Urban Area. These former municipalities, which became municipal units, are: (in parenthesis their population, 2011)

Messatida (13,852)
Paralia (9,987)
Patras (170,896)
Rio (14,034)
Vrachnaiika (4,627)

Demographics

The following list presents demographic data on the municipality of Patras over the years 2012.

From 2011 on, can data also reflect the city's urban area population, as all the municipalities that made up the Patras Urban Area were joined to create the new larger Patras municipality, formed at the 2011 local government reform.

Infrastructure

Heavy infrastructure works performed in the 2000s include the Peiros-Parapeiros dam (to provide water supply for Patras and surrounding towns) and a "small industries" park that will be constructed next to the Glaykos river and provide an easy connection with the new port.

The city is one of the main Greek internet and GRNET hubs and is connected with high speed lines to Athens as part of the backbone.

Two major state hospitals operate in the city: the Agios Andreas Hospital is the oldest of the two; and General University Hospital of Patras. There also exists two smaller state hospitals, Karamandanio - a children's hospital, and the Center of Chest Diseases of Southwestern Greece.  A large range of private hospitals and clinics operate in parallel.

Numerous art venues and an ultra-modern archaeological museum were constructed for the needs of European Culture Capital designation. The cultural and educational facilities include the Municipal Library, the university libraries, many theatres, the municipal art gallery, the University of Patras's facilities, the Hellenic Open University and the Technical Institute of Patras. A number of research facilities are also established in the university campus area.

Economy

The economy of the city largely depends on its service sector. Its main economic activities include retailing, logistics, financial and public sector services. Patras suffered a severe problem of deindustrialization in the late 1980s and 1990s when a number of major productive units shut down in successive order.  As a result, a considerable portion of the city's workforce and the city's economic planning in its entirety had to be re-evaluated and restructured by the authorities giving emphasis on the scientific research and technology sector. The University of Patras contributed by working towards this goal, using its service and technology sectors.
 
The area still retains some of its traditional winemaking and foodstuff industries as well as a small agricultural sector.  Major businesses in Patras include:

Services sector
Most Greek banks have their regional headquarters for Western Greece in Patras.

In 2010, the new Infocenter of Patras was established, inside the neoclassical building of the former market "Agora Argyri", in Ayiou Andreou street. The building includes a conference hall, along with multi-purpose and exhibitional spaces.
The regional unit of Achaea has about 4,800 hotels rooms and in 2006, 286,000 tourists, mainly from Greece, stayed in the area for a total of 634,000 days.

 Manufacturing sector 
Patras still has a large manufacturing base for a variety of industries.

The Titan Cement Company operates a large cement factory, with a private port, in Psathopyrgos, a suburb of Patras.

Patras hosts several timber manufacturing companies, and a wood distribution center of Shelman. The largest local company is Abex.
The paper sector is also active including a paper factory belonging to Georgia-Pacific (Delica) and two important Greek companies, Elite and El-pack, headquartered in the city.

Patras has several packing and industrial equipment companies. The most important of them are the local Antzoulatos and the multinational Frigoglass, a subsidiary of Coca-Cola, headquartered in the suburbs of Patras. Ideal Bikes is the leading bike producer in Greece, with large export activities.

The once omnipresent textile industry of the city is now almost defunct after the shut-down of the huge factory of Peiraiki-Patraiki (Πειραϊκή-Πατραϊκή), followed by numerous smaller textile industries. This had an important impact on the city's economy and resulted in high levels of unemployment in the 1990s.  The remains of the facilities still cover hundreds of acres in the south side of the city.

Patras companies also focus in dress production, the most important among them being DUR.

Food

Some of the largest industries in the city belong to the soft drinks and drinks sector. There are factories from Coca-Cola HBC and Athenian Brewery established in area, along with the facilities of the largest local company in soft-drinks production, Loux. The city is also home to many leading Greek wineries and distilleries, among them the venerable Achaia Clauss and Parparoussi located in Rio. In the food sector, Friesland Foods, through the local subsidiary NoyNoy, operates a new yogurt factory in the city's industrial area. Patras is also home to important fish-farming companies (Andromeda, Nireus). ECOFEED operates in the industrial zone of Patras, the largest fish-feeds factory in the Mediterranean. The city hosts the second-largest flour-mills in Greece, Kepenou-Mills.

Energy sector

Acciona has completed the largest wind park in Greece, on the Panachaiko mountain, overlooking the city of Patras. The Public Electric Company, operates a small hydroelectric plant on river Glafkos.

IT sector
Intracom (Greece's largest multinational provider of telecommunications products) facilities in Patras house the offices of Telecommunications Software Development, Terminal Equipment Design, Development Programmes, and Support Services divisions. Expansion plans have recently been completed. INTRASOFT, another core company of INTRACOM holdings group, has recently (2018) began operations in Patras and it is expected to expand its activities in 2019. The Corallia Innovation Hub, Innohub hosts many companies focusing on Microelectronics.  Among them one of the largest is the multinational software company Citrix Systems which operates a R&D centre with more than 100 computer scientists and engineers. Another company that maintains an R&D center in Patras is Dialog Semiconductor, a UK-based manufacturer of semiconductor-based system solutions. Another large Greek IT company, Unisystems announced recently (October 2018) the signing of a cooperation agreement with the Patras-based IT company Knowledge SA, that lays the foundation for the establishment of a Remote Development Center in Patras.

Research and technology
Patras Science Park is an incubator for many small but upcoming technology companies. CBL Patras, a global manufacturer of specialty chemicals and active pharmaceutical ingredients, is a startup from a professor of the University of Patras.

Vianex, owned by Pavlos Giannakopoulos, has its largest production facilities in the industrial area of the city.

Nobacco, a Greek electronic cigarette brand, works mainly with cooperation with the university of Patras.

There has been a significant development in the R&D sector, in the last few years, as a result of the many research institutes and the university impact in the area. The Computer Technology Institute and the Industrial Systems Institute of Greece are headquartered in Patras. The city is also a host to the FORTH-ICE-HT (Institute of Chemical Engineering & High Temperature Chemical Processes) and the Institute of Biomedical Technology.

Media

Culture

The cultural activity of Patras includes the Patras International Festival (with various artistic activities, mainly in the fields of theatre and music), the Patras Carnival  and the Poetry Symposium.

The city hosts many museums, including the Patras Archaeological Museum  the History and Ethnology Museum, the Folk Art Museum, the Press Museum and the Technology Museum, the latter in the campus of Patras University.

Other cultural institutes are: the Visual Arts Workshop, the icon painting school, the Carnival Float Workshop, the Municipal Library, the Municipal Gallery, along with many private art galleries. The architectural heritage of the city is dominated by neo-classicism, but also includes structures from other periods. Patras is also a pilot city of the Council of Europe and EU Intercultural cities  programme.

Theatrical tradition and music

The Patras Municipal and Regional Theatre was founded in June 1988, having as its main stage the city's landmark, the Apollon Theatre. Throughout its existence it has mounted critically acclaimed performances ranging from ancient dramaturgy and modern Greek, to international repertoire. The theatre cooperates with other theatrical groups, such as the Viomichaniki (Industrial) group and the Michani Technis (Art Machine).

The Roman Odeon hosts ancient dramas in the summer, while the Pantheon theater, the Art Factory, the Lithographeion and the Agora theatres provide additional venues. The International Festival of Patras takes place every summer, with a program consisting mostly of plays—both ancient drama and modern theatre—as well as various musical events.

Patras has also a very strong indie rock scene  with critically acclaimed bands such as Raining Pleasure, Abbie Gale, Serpentine, Doch an Doris and others.

Carnival

The Patras Carnival (Patrino Karnavali) is the largest event of its kind in Greece and one of the biggest in Europe, with a heritage reaching back 160 years. The events begin in January 17 each year (St. Anthony's nameday), and last until Clean Monday. Hundreds of thousands of visitors from all over the world gather each year for its festivities, which include large events such as the mammoth sized parades of the last two weeks (up to 50.000 participants each), the Hidden Treasure Hunt (Krymmenos Thisavros), concerts, expositions, theatrical, musical, comedy and other artistic contests and events. 
Patras Carnival was originally introduced as ball-masquee' events in 1835 by the Italian origin merchant family of Moretti.

European Capital of Culture 2006

Patras was chosen by the European Commission to be the European Capital of Culture for the year 2006. The concept of the event revolved around the main theme of "Bridges" and "Dialogues", drawing benefit from the city's rich history and its position as a "Gate to the West", to underline the essence of the productive interaction of culture and civilisations in Europe. The EU Commission found Patras' plans very ambitious and also commented that a successful hosting of the title by a medium-sized city would make it possible to redefine the meaning of the term Cultural Capital.

The Selection Panel for 2006 noted in its final report:

In 2006 various cultural events were held in the context of the European Capital of Culture. Among the artists presenting their work in Patras were: Gary Burton, Maxim Shostakovich, Ian Anderson - with the Patras Municipal Orchestra, Jean Louis Trintignant, Roberto Benigni, Eros Ramazzotti and José Carreras. With the completion of the Capital of Culture programme, a part of the old Ladopoulos factory was renovated to host exhibitions, a small theatre (named the Art Factory), was built and a number of neoclassical buildings around the city were renovated as part of a plan to preserve the city's architectural heritage and link it to its cultural life. The new Archaeological museum was completed in 2009. Its globe-like roof and modern architectural design enhances the town's northern entrance, taking its place among the other city landmarks.

Sports

Patras has several sports facilities and important teams in almost all the major Greek leagues. Panachaiki Gymnastiki Enosi, Apollon Patras, E.A. Patras and NO Patras are historically the major sports clubs based in the city, specialising in football, basketball, volleyball and water polo. The city's national stadium, Pampeloponnisiako Stadium, was renovated and expanded in 2004. Since 2009, a new event, the Patras International Circuit Kart takes place every September, turning the city streets into a circuit.	

The city has hosted several international sports events, such as the 1995 Basketball Under-19 World Cup (preliminaries), the 1995 Men's European Volleyball Championship (preliminaries), the 1997 Rhythmic Gymnastics European Championships, the 2001 World Wrestling Championships, the EuroBasket 2003 Women, the 2003 International Children's Games, a group stage of the football tournament in the 2004 Olympic Games, the 2007 World Rhythmic Gymnastics Championships, the 2008 World Deaf Football Championships and the 2019 Mediterranean Beach Games.
 

Religion

The city is the seat of the Greek Orthodox Metropolis of Patras. As in the rest of the country, the largest denomination is the Orthodox Church, which represents the majority of the population. There is also a sizeable community of Roman Catholics and an Anglican church, part of the Church of England's Diocese in Europe.

The most significant church in the city is the Orthodox Cathedral Church of Saint Andrew, in the south west of the city center. The construction of the church began in 1908 under the supervision of the architect Anastasios Metaxas, followed by Georgios Nomikos. It was inaugurated in 1974. It is the largest church in Greece and the third-largest Byzantine-style church in the Balkans, after the Cathedral of Saint Sava in Belgrade and Alexander Nevsky Cathedral in Sofia. It holds relics of Andrew the Apostle, which were returned to the city of Patras from St. Peter's Basilica, Rome in September, 1964, on the orders of Pope Paul VI.
Other historical churches of the city are: 
The church of Pantokrator (1832), the old cathedral, in the upper town district
The Metropolitan Church of Patras (1846) dedicated to Panayia Evangelistria, on Maisonos Street
The church of Ayios Nikolaos (1885), next to the steps of Ayiou Nikolaou street 
The church of Pantanassa (1859), Ipsilanti street
The church of Ayios Dimitrios, in the upper town district 
The Catholic Church of Saint Andrew (1937), on Maisonos Street
The Anglican church of Saint Andrew (1878), on Odos Agiou Andreou  
The old church of Ayios Andreas (1836–1843), next to the new temple. Situated in the site of Andrew the Apostle's martyrdom, it was built in basilica style by the architect Lysandros Kaftanzoglou.
Girokomiou Monastery (Holy Monastery of Panagia Girokomitissa): This historic monastery was founded in the 10th century AD in the eastern part of Patras. It was built on the ruins of an ancient temple of the goddess Artemis and for this reason the monastery's cathedral is dedicated to Saint Artemiοs. It is obvious that the monastery maintained a nursing home during the Byzantine period.
Monastery of Agios Nikolaos Bala (Paleomonastiro): Ιt is built at the foot of Panachaikos, at an altitude of 500 meters, near the village of Bala, 8 km northeast of Patras. This historic and picturesque monastery was founded at the end of the 17th century. A marble slab on the north outer side of the Cathedral tells of the restoration of the monastery in 1693. The monastery has also recently been renovated, numbering nineteen nuns and celebrating 6 December and 10 May.

Jewish community
The first Jewish presence in the city was dated back to the Hellenistic era (see Romaniotes). After World War II, the community almost disappeared and the last synagogue closed in 1950.

There is a district of the city named Evreomnimata, where the old Jewish cemetery was located.

Cuisine

Local specialities include:

Bourjeto (similar to the Corfiot Bourdeto)
Tilichtária Patrina, pork meat dish
Galatopita
Tiganites (type of pancakes)
Patrina loukoumia
Rodozachari
Mavrodafni wine
Tentura drink

 People 

The city has a significant political history in modern Greece; famous politicians from Patras include the prime ministers Dimitrios Gounaris, the main leader of the anti-venizelist party in the 1910s, Stylianos Gonatas, a high-ranking officer, politician and one of the leaders of the "1922 Revolution", Andreas Michalakopoulos, a prominent liberal party cadre, foreign minister and prime minister, and Dimitrios Maximos, a distinguished economist, minister and finally prime minister in the civil war era. More recent figures include the Papandreou family, arguably the most influential in post World War II Greece, Panagiotis Kanellopoulos, the last democratically elected head of government before the establishment of the 1967 junta, and Costis Stephanopoulos, the former president of the Hellenic Republic.

Transport

Seaport
The city has always been a sea-trade hub because of its strategic position. The port manages more than half of the foreign sea-passenger transportation in Greece, and has excellent car-ferry links with the Ionian islands and the major Adriatic ports of Italy. Additionally, a new port was built in the southern section of the city to accommodate the increased traffic and relieve the city centre from port operations.  In 2011, this port went into operation. Ferries to Italy now dock there.

The port is connected by a number of daily routes to the Ionian islands Kerkyra, Kefallonia and Zakynthos, to the port of Igoumenitsa and to the Italian cities Ancona, Bari, Brindisi, Trieste and Venice.

Roads
A newly constructed,  ring road (the Bypass of Patras) was first opened in 2002 in order to alleviate heavy traffic throughout the city. A mini ring road (known as the "Mini bypass" of Patras) is now complete (2019), alleviating heavy traffic-related problems in the city centre. The mini-bypass is a two lanes mototway bridging the northern city entrance at the Zavlani neighborhood to the eastern entrance at the Aroi, Synora and Upper town (Ano poli) neighborhoods reducing the city centre crossing time to less than 4 minutes drive. 

Two large highways were also constructed, connecting the seacoast and the new port with the Bypass of Patras. The first is over the small Diakoniaris river (from Eleftheriou Venizelou street until the Bypass'es exit in Eglykada), while the second consists of two roads,  each, that run in parallel with the Glafkos river entering at the city' s New Port. Another project was completed recently, leading to an additional entrance to the downtown area after expanding and widening Kanakari street. This work led to a fast, direct connection of the city's mini bypass road with the city centre.

The highway connection with Athens was recently upgraded to a 220km closed highway (Olympia odos), with a speed limit of 130km/hour, reducing the transit time to 1 hour and 45 minutes. The highway was connected to the Large bypass highway and is expected to extend all the way to Pyrgos by the end of 2023. Patras will also be the central hub of the Ionia Odos highway, intended to bridge western Greece from Kalamata to Ioannina and the Kakavia border station. The Rio-Antirio bridge is north of the city and links the Peloponnese to mainland Greece. It was completed in August 2004.

Additional work was recently announced to begin in 2023 in order to connect via highway the Rion Antirrion bridge with Nafpaktos, Itea, Amfissa and Lamia. This project is expected to reduce the trip to Lamia to 90 minutes and its completion is expexted in 2025.

Patras is bypassed by the Olympia Odos (A8) motorway, which is also part of the E55 route that crosses the Rio-Antirio Bridge, dominating the sealine across the Gulf of Corinth. 
GR-5/E55
GR-8/E55 and E65 (partly Panepistimiou Street)
GR-8A
GR-9/E55 (partly Akti Dymaion)
GR-33 (partly Kalavryton, Georgiou Papandreou Street and Akrotiriou)
Bypass of Patras

Rail
A rudimentary single, narrow gauge railway track crosses the city and connects it to Rio. In the past regional rail links were provided by the Hellenic Railways Organisation, connecting Patras to Athens and Piraeus as well as to Pyrgos and Kalamata. OSE announced the suspension of all the rail service in the Peloponnese in January 2011 so today (2018) the railway track is in use only by suburban trains that connect Patras with the adjacent villages of Rion and Agios Vasileios. The central passenger train station of Patras which is a small building constructed in 1954, lies to the west of the downtown area, between Othonos-Amalias Avenue and the north port. The main freight station of Aghios Andreas lies further to the south, next to the homonymous church and it is not in use any more. A new double standard gauge railway line to Korinth and further to Athens is under construction. The construction works are currently (2018) in progress close to the suburbs of Patras,  but the remaining few Kilometres till the city centre and the new port are still under study because of various financial and technical problems.

Public transport

Patras is served by buses. There are two transport lines to and from the University of Patras and some nearby lines to city suburbs like Saravali, Glafkos, and Paralia. All the urban bus lines are about 40, with three numbers.

Commuter rail services have recently been established by Proastiakos, with one line currently connecting Patras, Rio, and Agios Vasileios.

Regional bus links are provided by the KTEL bus company and connect the city to most of Greece.

Tram
Patras was the first Greek city to introduce public electrified tramways in the past. Before the economic crisis, there were proposals for reestablishment of tram lines.

Air

International relations
Patras is a pilot city of the Council of Europe and the European Commission Intercultural cities' programme.

Twin towns — sister cities

Patras is twinned with:

Patras was selected as main motif for the €10 Greek Patras 2006 commemorative coin, minted in 2006. This coin was designed to commemorate an event signaling an enlightened course for Patras and serving as a reminder of the way in which culture can stimulate the economy and promote development, when Patras was appointed European Capital of Culture. On the obverse is the logo for Patras 2006 around the words "European Capital of Culture".

Consulates
The city hosts consulates from the following countries:

Gallery

See also

University of Patras
University of Peloponnese
Apollon Theatre (Patras)
List of settlements in Achaea
Panachaiko
Cities in Greece

References

External links

The official website of the city 
official website of the Carnival of Patras 
Patras The Official website of the Greek National Tourism Organisation
 EΡΤ,ET1 TV,"Post-Museum" documentary - "The Patras New Archaeological Museum"
 "The Glaraki's School Complex  of Patras"

 
Cities in ancient Peloponnese
Populated places in Achaea
Municipalities of Western Greece
Populated coastal places in Greece
Greek prefectural capitals
Greek regional capitals
Mediterranean port cities and towns in Greece
Coloniae (Roman)
Roman towns and cities in Greece
Roman sites in Greece
Municipality of Patras
Greek city-states
Territories of the Republic of Venice